Polar Bear Peak is a  mountain in the U.S. state of Alaska, located in Chugach State Park. Situated in the Chugach Mountains, it lies at the head of South Fork Eagle River,  ESE of Eagle Lake, and  ESE of downtown Anchorage. The peak was named in 1963 by members of the Mountaineering Club of Alaska because a snow patch on its north face resembles a Polar bear skin.

Terrain 
Beginning at approximately 1000 ft., Polar Bear Peak becomes a predominantly alpine zone, characterized by exposed rock, extremely scant vegetation, a variety of lichens, and snow pack (including year-round snowfields and glaciers).

Wildlife 
Like many Alaskan mountains, Polar Bear Peak may be frequented by rock ptarmigan, Dall sheep, mountain goats, and other alpine animals. Despite the lack of vegetation, a variety of insects thrive at high elevations throughout Alaska. Overhead, one may spot a hawk or eagle.

References 

Mountains of Anchorage, Alaska
Mountains of Alaska